The 3rd constituency of Calvados is a French legislative constituency in the Calvados département. Like the other 576 French constituencies, it elects one MP using the two-round system, with a run-off if no candidate receives over 50% of the vote in the first round.

Historic representation

Election results

2022 

 
 
 
 
 
 
|-
| colspan="8" bgcolor="#E9E9E9"|
|-

2017

2012 

|- style="background-color:#E9E9E9;text-align:center;"
! colspan="2" rowspan="2" style="text-align:left;" | Candidate
! rowspan="2" colspan="2" style="text-align:left;" | Party
! colspan="2" | 1st round
! colspan="2" | 2nd round
|- style="background-color:#E9E9E9;text-align:center;"
! width="75" | Votes
! width="30" | %
! width="75" | Votes
! width="30" | %
|-
| style="background-color:" |
| style="text-align:left;" | Clotilde Valter
| style="text-align:left;" | Socialist Party
| PS
| 
| 38.52%
| 
| 51.20%
|-
| style="background-color:" |
| style="text-align:left;" | Claude Leteurtre
| style="text-align:left;" | New Centre-Presidential Majority
| NCE
| 
| 34.75%
| 
| 48.80%
|-
| style="background-color:" |
| style="text-align:left;" | Sandrine Linares
| style="text-align:left;" | Front National
| FN
| 
| 14.88%
| colspan="2" style="text-align:left;" |
|-
| style="background-color:" |
| style="text-align:left;" | Serge Loiseau
| style="text-align:left;" | Left Front
| FG
| 
| 4.53%
| colspan="2" style="text-align:left;" |
|-
| style="background-color:" |
| style="text-align:left;" | Sabine Michaux
| style="text-align:left;" | Europe Ecology – The Greens
| EELV
| 
| 3.42%
| colspan="2" style="text-align:left;" |
|-
| style="background-color:" |
| style="text-align:left;" | Christine Annoot
| style="text-align:left;" | Miscellaneous Right
| DVD
| 
| 2.36%
| colspan="2" style="text-align:left;" |
|-
| style="background-color:" |
| style="text-align:left;" | Michel Langevin
| style="text-align:left;" | Far Left
| EXG
| 
| 0.94%
| colspan="2" style="text-align:left;" |
|-
| style="background-color:" |
| style="text-align:left;" | Christophe Mussle
| style="text-align:left;" | Far Left
| EXG
| 
| 0.60%
| colspan="2" style="text-align:left;" |
|-
| colspan="8" style="background-color:#E9E9E9;"|
|- style="font-weight:bold"
| colspan="4" style="text-align:left;" | Total
| 
| 100%
| 
| 100%
|-
| colspan="8" style="background-color:#E9E9E9;"|
|-
| colspan="4" style="text-align:left;" | Registered voters
| 
| style="background-color:#E9E9E9;"|
| 
| style="background-color:#E9E9E9;"|
|-
| colspan="4" style="text-align:left;" | Blank/Void ballots
| 
| 1.74%
| 
| 3.05%
|-
| colspan="4" style="text-align:left;" | Turnout
| 
| 58.42%
| 
| 59.09%
|-
| colspan="4" style="text-align:left;" | Abstentions
| 
| 41.58%
| 
| 40.91%
|-
| colspan="8" style="background-color:#E9E9E9;"|
|- style="font-weight:bold"
| colspan="6" style="text-align:left;" | Result
| colspan="2" style="background-color:" | PS GAIN FROM NC
|}

2007 

|- style="background-color:#E9E9E9;text-align:center;"
! colspan="2" rowspan="2" style="text-align:left;" | Candidate
! rowspan="2" colspan="2" style="text-align:left;" | Party
! colspan="2" | 1st round
! colspan="2" | 2nd round
|- style="background-color:#E9E9E9;text-align:center;"
! width="75" | Votes
! width="30" | %
! width="75" | Votes
! width="30" | %
|-
| style="background-color:" |
| style="text-align:left;" | Claude Leteurtre
| style="text-align:left;" | New Centre-Presidential Majority
| NCE
| 
| 29.94%
| 
| 52.84%
|-
| style="background-color:" |
| style="text-align:left;" | Clotilde Valter
| style="text-align:left;" | Socialist Party
| PS
| 
| 28.21%
| 
| 47.16%
|-
| style="background-color:" |
| style="text-align:left;" | Eric Lehericy
| style="text-align:left;" | Miscellaneous Right
| DVD
| 
| 22.20%
| colspan="2" style="text-align:left;" |
|-
| style="background-color:" |
| style="text-align:left;" | Marcelle Bazil
| style="text-align:left;" | Front National
| FN
| 
| 3.31%
| colspan="2" style="text-align:left;" |
|-
| style="background-color:" |
| style="text-align:left;" | Brigitte Jacob
| style="text-align:left;" | Far Left
| EXG
| 
| 2.75%
| colspan="2" style="text-align:left;" |
|-
| style="background-color:" |
| style="text-align:left;" | Flavie Pasquet
| style="text-align:left;" | Hunting, Fishing, Nature, Traditions
| CPNT
| 
| 2.60%
| colspan="2" style="text-align:left;" |
|-
| style="background-color:" |
| style="text-align:left;" | Laurence Morand
| style="text-align:left;" | The Greens
| VEC
| 
| 2.48%
| colspan="2" style="text-align:left;" |
|-
| style="background-color:" |
| style="text-align:left;" | Serge Loiseau
| style="text-align:left;" | Communist
| PCF
| 
| 1.94%
| colspan="2" style="text-align:left;" |
|-
| style="background-color:" |
| style="text-align:left;" | Paul Mercier
| style="text-align:left;" | Movement for France
| MPF
| 
| 1.37%
| colspan="2" style="text-align:left;" |
|-
| style="background-color:" |
| style="text-align:left;" | Thi Mai Tram Tran
| style="text-align:left;" | Far Left
| EXG
| 
| 1.20%
| colspan="2" style="text-align:left;" |
|-
| style="background-color:" |
| style="text-align:left;" | Marie-Claude Herboux
| style="text-align:left;" | Far Left
| EXG
| 
| 1.18%
| colspan="2" style="text-align:left;" |
|-
| style="background-color:" |
| style="text-align:left;" | Alain Angelini
| style="text-align:left;" | Ecologist
| ECO
| 
| 1.02%
| colspan="2" style="text-align:left;" |
|-
| style="background-color:" |
| style="text-align:left;" | Jacques Bessin
| style="text-align:left;" | Independent
| DIV
| 
| 0.80%
| colspan="2" style="text-align:left;" |
|-
| style="background-color:" |
| style="text-align:left;" | Yves Dupres
| style="text-align:left;" | Far Right
| EXD
| 
| 0.59%
| colspan="2" style="text-align:left;" |
|-
| style="background-color:" |
| style="text-align:left;" | Patrick Bunel
| style="text-align:left;" | Miscellaneous Right
| DVD
| 
| 0.39%
| colspan="2" style="text-align:left;" |
|-
| colspan="8" style="background-color:#E9E9E9;"|
|- style="font-weight:bold"
| colspan="4" style="text-align:left;" | Total
| 
| 100%
| 
| 100%
|-
| colspan="8" style="background-color:#E9E9E9;"|
|-
| colspan="4" style="text-align:left;" | Registered voters
| 
| style="background-color:#E9E9E9;"|
| 
| style="background-color:#E9E9E9;"|
|-
| colspan="4" style="text-align:left;" | Blank/Void ballots
| 
| 2.17%
| 
| 3.20%
|-
| colspan="4" style="text-align:left;" | Turnout
| 
| 60.48%
| 
| 59.52%
|-
| colspan="4" style="text-align:left;" | Abstentions
| 
| 39.52%
| 
| 40.48%
|-
| colspan="8" style="background-color:#E9E9E9;"|
|- style="font-weight:bold"
| colspan="6" style="text-align:left;" | Result
| colspan="2" style="background-color:" | NC GAIN FROM UDF
|}

2002 

 
 
 
 
 
 
 
 
 
|-
| colspan="8" bgcolor="#E9E9E9"|
|-

1997

Sources
 Official results of French elections from 1998: 

3